The MAMCO is the contemporary art museum of Geneva, which opened in 1994. The building is a former factory building, with 3000 m2 of exhibition space, it is the largest contemporary art museum of Switzerland.

From 1994 to 2015, MAMCO was directed by Christian Bernard; and starting from 2016 until present, MAMCO is directed by Lionel Bovier.

The museum hosts permanent installations from artist Robert Filliou, Maurizio Nannucci, Claudio Parmiggiani, Claude Rutault, Philippe Thomas, along with the reconstitution of the apartement of Ghislain Mollet-Viéville, and symmetrically a room dedicated to the presentation of works from the Yoon Ja and Paul Devautour collection.

References

External links

 

1994 establishments in Switzerland
Art museums and galleries in Switzerland
Modern art museums
Contemporary art galleries in Switzerland
Art galleries established in 1994
Museums in Geneva